

2015–16 Top 3 standings

Standings

References

Nation